Milford is a city in Kent and Sussex counties in the U.S. state of Delaware. According to the 2020 census, the population of the city is 11,190 people and 4,356 households in the city.

The Kent County portion of Milford is part of the Dover, DE Metropolitan Statistical Area and the Philadelphia-Reading-Camden, PA-NJ-DE-MD Combined Statistical Area, while the Sussex County portion is part of the Salisbury, MD-DE Metropolitan Statistical Area.

History
The Kent County side of Milford was first settled in 1680 by Henry Bowan on what was known as the Saw Mill Range. A century later the Reverend Sydenham Thorne built a dam across the Mispillion River to generate power for his gristmill and sawmill. Around the same time, Joseph Oliver laid out the first city streets and plots nearby on a part of his plantation. Soon a number of homes and businesses appeared along Front Street. The city was incorporated February 5, 1807.

In the 1770s, a ship building industry was already flourishing on the Mispillion River. Shipbuilding continued to be the major industry of Milford through World War I, bringing considerable prosperity to the town. At one point six shipyards were operating in the downtown area. When the last of the area's giant white oaks was cut in the 1920s, the shipyards quickly went out of business, although the Mispillion ships sailed on for many years. (The Paul was sunk by a German torpedo in 1942 while sailing from the Bahamas.) The Vineyard shipyard was called into service in both World War I and II to build submarine chasers.

During much of the twentieth century Milford served primarily as the commercial center for much of southern Delaware's large agricultural community.

Seven of Delaware's governors have come from Milford: Daniel Rogers (who served 1797–99), Joseph Haslet (1811–14), William Tharp (1847–1851), Peter F. Causey (1855–59), William Burton (1859–63), William T. Watson (1895–97), and Ruth Ann Minner (2001–09).

Abbott's Mill, Bank House, Carlisle House, Christ Church, Dr. Dawson House, Draper House, Egglinton Hall, Golden Mine, Grier House, Peter Lofland House, James McColley House, Milford New Century Club, Milford Railroad Station, Milford Shipyard Area Historic District, Mill House, Mispillion Lighthouse and Beacon Tower, North Milford Historic District, Old Fire House, Parson Thorne Mansion, South Milford Historic District Walnut Farm, Gov. William T. Watson Mansion, and J. H. Wilkerson & Son Brickworks are listed on the National Register of Historic Places.

On Friday, May 30, 2003 at approximately 3:00 p.m. a fire started in a second floor apartment next to Wiley Hardware & Appliance on Walnut Street in the historic downtown section of Milford. More than 200 firefighters from Milford, Ellendale, Harrington, Felton, Dover, Smyrna, Houston, Frederica, Slaughter Beach, Bowers Beach, Greenwood, South Bowers, Farmington, Magnolia, Cheswold, Lewes, Georgetown, and Bridgeville in Delaware and Greensboro and Goldsboro in Maryland fought the blaze which destroyed seven businesses, a church, and three apartments, destroying an entire city block in the historic section of town. No one was killed in the blaze, but one civilian and six firefighters were injured.

Geography and climate
Milford is located at  (38.9126129, −75.4279748), along the Mispillion River, which runs through the city.

Education 
Milford School District operates public schools.

Infrastructure

Transportation

Milford is served by several state roads connecting it to other points in Delaware. Delaware Route 1 bypasses Milford to the east along the Milford Bypass and heads north to Dover and southeast to the Delaware Beaches. A business route of DE 1, Delaware Route 1 Business, passes through the city along Rehoboth Boulevard and North Walnut Street. U.S. Route 113 begins at DE 1 at the north end of the Milford and heads south through the city on Dupont Boulevard, continuing south to Georgetown. Delaware Route 14 runs east–west through the city on Northwest Front Street and Northeast Front Street, heading west to Harrington and east to its terminus at the DE 1 bypass. Delaware Route 36 runs east–west through the city on Lakeview Avenue, Causey Avenue, and Southeast Front Street, heading southwest to Greenwood and east to Slaughter Beach. Delaware Route 15 begins at DE 14 west of Milford and heads northwest to Canterbury. Delaware Route 30 begins at DE 1 and DE 1 Business southeast of Milford and heads south toward Milton and Millsboro. DART First State provides bus service to Milford along Route 210, which runs through the city between the Bayhealth Hospital, Sussex Campus and the Walmart in the northern part of Milford; Route 303, which runs north to Dover and south to Georgetown; and Route 307, which runs north to Dover and south to Lewes. The Indian River Subdivision line of the Delmarva Central Railroad passes through Milford.

Utilities
The city's electric department is a member of the Delaware Municipal Electric Corporation (DEMEC) and purchases its power from the PJM Power Grid. The City of Milford serves about 6,500 customers. The Public Works department provides water, sewer, trash and recycling collection to Milford. Natural gas service in Milford is provided by Chesapeake Utilities.

Milford is home to the Milford Solar Farm, a 15 MW, 80 acre solar power farm owned by the Public Service Enterprise Group and is the largest solar power farm in Delaware. DEMEC purchases the power generated from the solar farm.

Health care
Bayhealth Medical Center operates the Bayhealth Hospital, Sussex Campus in Milford. The hospital offers various inpatient services include a birthing room and cardiovascular and cancer services. The Sussex Campus also offers numerous outpatient services, patient and family support services, community outreach, and imaging services. The hospital has a 24-hour emergency room with a Level III trauma center. On May 27, 2016, Bayhealth Medical Center broke ground on the Bayhealth Sussex Campus to replace the former Milford Memorial Hospital. The six-story hospital cost between $275 million and $300 million to build. Bayhealth Sussex Campus opened on February 5, 2019. Milford Memorial Hospital will be converted by Nationwide Health Services into a multi-use healthcare-focused community that would include a nursing home.

Demographics

As of the 2020 census, there were 11,190 people and 4,356 households in the city.

In the city, the population was spread out with 26.4% under the age of 18, 44.3% from 18 to 64, and 20.6% who were 65 years of age or older.

The racial makeup of the city was 62% White, 26% African American, 0.6% Native American, 1.4% Asian, 0.3% Pacific Islander, and 4.5% from 2 or more races.

The median household income according to the 2020 census is $47,824.  14.1% of families are below poverty level, which is slightly higher than the national average of 11.4%, and higher than the Kent County and Sussex County average of 13% and 11% respectively.

Notable people

Mike Bagley, commentator for Motor Racing Network and co-host of The Morning Drive on Sirius XM NASCAR Radio
Jeff Baldwin, baseball player
Robert Crumb, a famous cartoonist, lived in Milford for a few years and attended high school there
Albert Jackson, the first black letter carrier in Canada
Simmie Knox began to teach himself to paint while living in Milford as a young man; he later became the first African-American to paint an official presidential portrait – that of President Bill Clinton
John Lofland (1798–1849), widely known as the "Milford Bard", was a prolific and widely read writer of prose, verse and speeches; he grew up and spent much of his life in "The Towers" on North West Front Street
Ruth Ann Minner, Governor of Delaware 2001–2009
Harold Peterman, state legislator
Luke Petitgout, former American football offensive tackle played in the National Football League for the New York Giants and Tampa Bay Buccaneers
Chris Short, star baseball pitcher for Philadelphia Phillies in 1960s, was born in Milford
Alfred Thomas Archimedes Torbert, Union General in the civil war and diplomat
William T. Watson, 49th Governor of Delaware

References

External links

Downtown Milford, Inc.

 
Cities in Kent County, Delaware
Cities in Sussex County, Delaware
Populated places established in 1680
1680 establishments in Delaware
Cities in Delaware
Salisbury metropolitan area